Jocara conspicualis is a species of snout moth in the genus Jocara. It was described by Julius Lederer in 1863, and is known from Brazil and Colombia.

References

Moths described in 1863
Jocara